Frederick J. Mess (February 1872 – July 29, 1951) was an American politician in the state of Washington. He served in the Washington House of Representatives from 1917 to 1933.

References

Republican Party members of the Washington House of Representatives
1872 births
1951 deaths